Bjørn Petter Westlie (born 23 July 1949) is a Norwegian journalist, historian, university college lecturer and non-fiction writer.

In 1995, as a journalist for the newspaper Dagens Næringsliv, Westlie published a major article about the looting of the Norwegian Jews during the Second World War. In many cases the survivors were not able to reclaim any valuables, businesses or properties.

Together with historian Bjarte Bruland’s research this article started a public settlement process ending with the Government giving financial compensation and issuing a public apology.

In most of his books Westlie has focused on the Second World War. Maktens ansikt (The Face of Power) from 1991 is a portrait of Milorg leader and later politician Jens Chr. Hauge. In 2002 he published Oppgjør: I skyggen av Holocaust (Revisitation – In the Shadow of the Holocaust). Fars krig (My Father’s War) from 2008 told the story about his father, who was an SS volunteer. This book received the Brage Prize and is also translated into Ukrainian (2015). His latest book, Fangene som forsvant. NSB og slavearbeiderne på Nordlandsbanen (The Disappeared Prisoners. NSB (Norwegian State Railways) and the Slave Labourers on the Nordland Line) came out in 2015.

Radicalism 
For about ten years, from 1974 and onward, Bjørn Westlie was a member of the Workers' Communist Party. In interviews he has described his activism mainly as a reaction to the Vietnam War. According to himself, Westlie has repeatedly been rethinking his own embrace of extreme political movements when trying to decipher his father’s choices.

Personal life 
Bjørn Westlie lives in Oslo. He is married to researcher, journalist, university college lecturer and writer Anne Hege Simonsen. Westlie has two daughters and one grandchild.

See also
The history of the Norwegian State Railways

Selected works 
 1988: I grenselandet: når forskning flytter grensen mellom liv og død., Universitetsforlaget 
 1991: Maktens ansikt: et portrett av Jens Chr. Hauge – with Alf Ole Ask, Gyldendal 
 1995: Drømmen om det perfekte mennesket. Fra arvehygiene til genhygiene, Gyldendal
 1996: Coming to terms with the past: The process of restitution of Jewish property in Norway, Institute of the World Jewish Congress
 2002: Oppgjør – I skyggen av Holocaust, Aschehoug
 2008: Fars krig, Aschehoug
 2012: Hitlers norske budbringere, Aschehoug
 2015: Fangene som forsvant. NSB og slavearbeiderne på Nordlandsbanen, Spartacus
 2019: Det norske jødehatet - propaganda og presse under okkupasjonen, Res Publica
 2022: Mørke år. Norge og jødene på 1930-tallet, Res Publica

References

1949 births
Living people
Norwegian journalists
Norwegian non-fiction writers